Real Time Rome is the MIT Senseable City Lab’s contribution to the 2006 Venice Biennale, directed by professor Richard Burdett. The project aggregated data from cell phones (obtained using Telecom Italia's innovative Lochness platform), buses and taxis in Rome to better understand urban dynamics in real time. By revealing the pulse of the city, the project aims to show how technology can help individuals make more informed decisions about their environment. In the long run, this project is intended to reduce the inefficiencies of present-day urban systems and open the way to a more sustainable urban future.

Video art